The 2008 Minnesota House of Representatives election was held in the U.S. state of Minnesota on November 4, 2008, to elect members to the House of Representatives of the 86th Minnesota Legislature. A primary election was held in several districts on September 9, 2008.

The Minnesota Democratic–Farmer–Labor Party (DFL) won a majority of seats, remaining the majority party, followed by the Republican Party of Minnesota. The new Legislature convened on January 6, 2009.

Results

See also
 Minnesota Senate election, 2006
 Minnesota gubernatorial election, 2006
 Minnesota elections, 2008

References

External links
 Color shaded map showing winning margin by district (PDF) from 2008 Election Maps, Minnesota Secretary of State

2008 Minnesota elections
Minnesota House of Representatives elections